The False Memory Syndrome Foundation (FMSF) was a nonprofit organization founded in 1992 and dissolved in late 2019.

The FMSF was created by Pamela and Peter Freyd, after their adult daughter Jennifer Freyd accused Peter Freyd of sexual abuse when she was a child. The FMSF described its purpose as the examination of the concept of false memory syndrome and recovered memory therapy and advocacy on behalf of individuals believed to be falsely accused of child sexual abuse with a focus on preventing future incidents, helping individuals and reconciling families affected by FMS, publicizing information about FMS, sponsoring research on it and discovering methods to distinguish true and false memories of abuse.  This initial group was composed of academics and professionals and the organization sought out researchers in the fields of memory and clinical practice to form its advisory board. The goal of the FMSF expanded to become more than an advocacy organization, also attempting to address the issues of memory that seemed to have caused the behavioral changes in their now-adult children.

Mike Stanton in the Columbia Journalism Review stated that the FMSF "helped revolutionize the way the press and the public view one of the angriest debates in America—whether an adult can suddenly remember long-forgotten childhood abuse". It originated the terms false memory syndrome and recovered memory therapy to describe, respectively, what they hypothesized to be the orientation of patients towards confabulations created by inappropriate psychotherapy, and the methods through which these confabulations are created. Neither term is acknowledged by the Diagnostic and Statistical Manual of Mental Disorders, but they are included in public advisory guidelines relating to mental health. The FMSF has been accused of misrepresenting the science of memory, protecting child abusers, and encouraging a societal denial of the existence of child sexual abuse.

History
In 1990 Jennifer Freyd, with the support of her grandmother and uncle, privately accused her father of sexually abusing her throughout her teenage years after allegedly recovering memories that surfaced after treatment by a therapist for issues related to severe anxiety regarding an upcoming visit from her parents. Peter Freyd, Jennifer's father, denied that he had sexually abused his daughter. According to Philadelphia Magazine, Peter Freyd said that someone in the Freyd household would have been aware of the alleged abuse, because the Freyd's dog would have barked due to the commotion elicited by his alleged abuse.

In a letter written to PBS Frontline in response to a documentary that referenced allegations of incest, Peter Freyd's brother and Jennifer Freyd's uncle William stated that Freyd and his wife Pamela grew up in the same household as step-siblings.Whitfield, C. (1995). Memory and abuse: Remembering and healing the effects of trauma . Deerfield Beach , FL : Health Communications, Inc. He added that, in his view, "The False Memory Syndrome Foundation is designed to deny a reality that Peter and Pam have spent most of their lives trying to escape," and that he was certain abuse happened to his niece.

In 1991, Pamela Freyd published an anonymous first-person account of the accusation in a journal that focused on false accusations of child sexual abuse. The article was reproduced and circulated widely, including to Dr. Freyd's psychology department at the University of Oregon where she taught. Jennifer Freyd later stated that copies sent to her workplace contained notes de-anonymizing the article and that it contained numerous inaccuracies, including the circumstances of the original memories of abuse and the portrayal of her personal life. The FMSF was formed one year later by Pamela and Peter Freyd, with the support and encouragement of therapists Hollida Wakefield and Ralph Underwager. Initially the early membership and advisory board of the FMSF consisted of parents who had been accused of sexually abusing their now-adult children when they were younger, but it rapidly expanded to include professionals with expertise in the area of memory.

The FMSF claimed 2000 members in 1993.

Ralph Underwager was a member of the foundation's scientific advisory board in 1993 when his comments from a 1991 interview he and his wife Hollida Wakefield gave to Paidika: The Journal of Paedophilia came to public awareness. The article contained statements which were interpreted as supportive of paedophilia. In particular, when asked "Is choosing paedophilia for you a responsible choice for the individuals?" Underwager responded,
Certainly it is responsible. What I have been struck by as I have come to know more about and understand people who choose paedophilia is that they let themselves be too much defined by other people. That is usually an essentially negative definition. Paedophiles spend a lot of time and energy defending their choice. I don't think that a paedophile needs to do that. Paedophiles can boldly and courageously affirm what they choose. They can say that what they want is to find the best way to love. I am also a theologian and as a theologian, I believe it is God's will that there be closeness and intimacy, unity of the flesh, between people. A paedophile can say: "This closeness is possible for me within the choices that I've made."
Paedophiles are too defensive. They go around saying, "You people out there are saying that what I choose is bad, that it's no good. You're putting me in prison, you're doing all these terrible things to me. I have to define my love as being in some way or other illicit." What I think is that paedophiles can make the assertion that the pursuit of intimacy and love is what they choose. With boldness, they can say, "I believe this is in fact part of God's will." They have the right to make these statements for themselves as personal choices. Now whether or not they can persuade other people they are right is another matter (laughs).
In the controversy that followed, Underwager resigned from the FMSF's scientific advisory board. Underwager later stated that the quotations in the Paidika article were taken out of context, used to discredit his ability to testify in courts and, through guilt by association, damage the reputation of the FMSF.

The founders of the FMS Foundation were concerned alleged 'recovered memories' were being reported after the use of controversial therapy techniques, including hypnosis, relaxation exercises, guided imagery, drug-mediated interviews, body memories, literal dream interpretation and journaling. It is the position of the FMSF that there is no scientific evidence that the use of consciousness-altering techniques such as these can reveal or accurately elaborate factual information about previously forgotten past experiences, including sexual abuse.

According to the FMS Foundation, "The controversy is not about whether children are abused. Child abuse is a serious social problem that requires our attention. Neither is the controversy about whether people may not remember past abuse. There are many reasons why people may not remember something: childhood amnesia, physical trauma, drugs or the natural decay of stored information. The controversy is about the accuracy of claims of recovered "repressed" memories of abuse. The consequences profoundly affect the law, the way therapy is practiced, families and people's lives."

Members of the FMS Foundation Scientific Advisory Board included a number of members of the National Academy of Sciences and Institute of Medicine: Aaron T. Beck, Rochel Gelman, Lila Gleitman, Ernest Hilgard (deceased), Philip S. Holzman, Elizabeth Loftus, Paul R. McHugh, and Ulric Neisser. The Scientific Advisory Board included both clinicians and researchers. The FMS Foundation was funded by contributions and had no ties to any commercial ventures.

The FMSF dissolved on December 31, 2019, quoting the increasing number of internet forums for people concerned about false memories to meet on outside of the Foundation.

Reception and impact
Stanton states that "Rarely has such a strange and little-understood organization had such a profound effect on media coverage of such a controversial matter." A study showed that in 1991 prior to the group's foundation, of the stories about abuse in several popular press outlets  "more than 80 percent of the coverage was weighted toward stories of survivors, with recovered memory taken for granted and questionable therapy virtually ignored" but that three years later "more than 80 percent of the coverage focused on false accusations, often involving supposedly false memory" which the author of the study, Katherine Beckett, attributed to FMSF.

J.A. Walker claimed the FMSF reversed the gains made by feminists and victims in gaining acknowledgment of the incestuous sexual abuse of children.  S.J. Dallam criticized the foundation for describing itself as a scientific organization while undertaking partisan political and social activity.

The claims made by the FMSF for the incidence and prevalence of false memories have been criticized as lacking evidence and disseminating alleged inaccurate statistics about the problem. Despite claiming to offer scientific evidence for the existence of FMS, the FMSF has no criteria for one of the primary features of the proposed syndrome – how to determine whether the accusation is true or false. Most of the reports by the FMSF are anecdotal, and the studies cited to support the contention that false memories can be easily created are often based on experiments that bear little resemblance to memories of actual sexual abuse. In addition, though the FMSF claims false memories are due to dubious therapeutic practices, the organization presents no data to demonstrate these practices are widespread or form an organized treatment modality. Within the anecdotes used by the FMSF to support their contention that faulty therapy causes false memories, some include examples of people who recovered their memories outside of therapy.

Astrophysicist and astrobiologist Carl Sagan cited material from a 1995 issue of the FMS Newsletter in his critique of the recovered memory claims of UFO abductees and those purporting to be victims of Satanic ritual abuse in his last book, The Demon-Haunted World: Science as a Candle in the Dark.

Notes

External links
 
 False Memory Syndrome Foundation on the Nonprofit Explorer at ProPublica

Child abuse-related organizations
Memory
Organizations established in 1992